In statistics, the generalized linear array model (GLAM) is used for analyzing data sets with array structures. It based on the generalized linear model with the design matrix written as a Kronecker product.

Overview 
The generalized linear array model or GLAM was introduced in 2006.  Such models provide a structure and a computational procedure for fitting generalized linear models or GLMs whose model matrix can be written as a Kronecker product and whose data can be written as an array.  In a large GLM, the GLAM approach gives very substantial savings in both storage and computational time over the usual GLM algorithm.

Suppose that the data  is arranged in a -dimensional array with size ; thus, the corresponding data vector  has size .  Suppose also that the design matrix is of the form

The standard analysis of a GLM with data vector  and design matrix  proceeds by repeated evaluation of the scoring algorithm

and 
 
is the working variable.

Computationally, GLAM provides array algorithms to calculate the linear predictor, 
 
and the weighted inner product 

without evaluation of the model matrix

Example

On the other hand, the row tensor function  of the  matrix   is the example of Face-splitting product of matrices, which was proposed by Vadym Slyusar in 1996:

where  means Face-splitting product.

These low storage high speed formulae extend to -dimensions.

Applications
GLAM is designed to be used in -dimensional smoothing problems where the data are arranged in an array and the smoothing matrix is constructed as a Kronecker product of  one-dimensional smoothing matrices.

References

Regression models
Array model